The 1907 Liverpool Kirkdale by-election was a by-election held in England on 27 September 1907 for the House of Commons constituency of Liverpool Kirkdale, a division of the city of Liverpool.

Vacancy 
The seat had become vacant when the sitting Conservative Member of Parliament (MP), David MacIver had died on 1 September 1907, aged 67. He had held the seat since being elected unopposed at a by-election in 1898,
having previously been MP for Birkenhead from 1874 to 1885.

Candidates 
The Liberal Unionist candidate was 63-year-old Charles McArthur, who had been the MP for Liverpool Exchange from 1897 until his defeat at the  1906 general election.

The Labour Party candidate was 42-year-old John Hill, a Scottish trade unionist who unsuccessfully contested Glasgow Govan at the 1906 general election.

Result 
On a slightly increased turnout, the result was a narrow victory for McArthur, who slightly increased his majority of that won by McIver in 1906.

Aftermath 
McArthur held the seat at the January 1910 general election, but died in office later that year, triggering another by-election.

Hill did not stand for Parliament again, but became general secretary of the United Society of Boilermakers and Iron and Steel Shipbuilders in 1909, and served as President of the Trades Union Congress in 1917.

See also
 Liverpool Kirkdale constituency
 Kirkdale, Merseyside
 1898 Liverpool Kirkdale by-election
 1910 Liverpool Kirkdale by-election
 1915 Liverpool Kirkdale by-election
 List of United Kingdom by-elections (1900–1918)

References 

Kirkdale, 1907
1907 elections in the United Kingdom
1907 in England
September 1907 events
1900s in Liverpool